Peretu is a commune in Teleorman County, Muntenia, Romania. It is composed of a single village, Peretu.

See also
 Helmet of Peretu

References

Communes in Teleorman County
Localities in Muntenia